Nomads SC may refer to:

 Manila Nomads Sports Club, sports club in the Philippines
 Nomads Soccer Club, soccer club in the United States
 Nomads Sports Club, defunct cricket team in Sri Lanka